Tumyr is a surname. Notable people with the surname include:

Arne Tumyr (born 1933), Norwegian journalist, newspaper editor, and politician
Erik Tumyr (1962–2011), Norwegian journalist, son of Arne

Norwegian-language surnames